On November 6, 1984, the District of Columbia held an election for its non-voting House delegate representing the District of Columbia's at-large congressional district. The winner of the race was Walter E. Fauntroy (D), who won his seventh re-election. All elected members would serve in 99th United States Congress.

The delegate is elected for two-year terms.

Candidates 
Walter E. Fauntroy, a Democrat, sought re-election for his eighth term to the United States House of Representatives. Fauntroy was completely unopposed in this election, although some voters still chose to write in other names.  Fauntroy was nevertheless re-elected with over 95% of the vote.

Results

See also
 United States House of Representatives elections in the District of Columbia

References 

United States House 
District of Columbia
1984